Encryphia is a monotypic moth genus in the family Geometridae erected by Alfred Jefferis Turner in 1904. Its only species, Encryphia frontisignata, first described by Francis Walker in 1863, is found in Australia.

References

Desmobathrinae
Monotypic moth genera